Săcelu is a commune in Gorj County, Oltenia, Romania. It is composed of five villages: Blahnița de Sus, Hăiești, Jeriștea, Magherești and Săcelu.

References

Communes in Gorj County
Localities in Oltenia